Qasemabad-e Veynesar (also Romanized as Qāsemābād-e Veynesār and Qāsemābād-e Veynes̄ār; also known as Qāsemābād) is a village in Howmeh Rural District, in the Central District of Bijar County, Kurdistan Province, Iran. At the 2006 census, its population was 48, in 8 families. The village is populated by Kurds.

References 

Towns and villages in Bijar County
Kurdish settlements in Kurdistan Province